McLeod's Daughters is an Australian drama television series created by Posie Graeme-Evans and Caroline Stanton for the Nine Network, which aired from 8 August 2001, to 31 January 2009, lasting eight seasons. It stars Lisa Chappell and Bridie Carter in the leading roles as two sisters reunited after twenty years of separation, thrust into a working relationship when they inherit their family's cattle station in South Australia. The series is produced by Millennium Television, in association with Nine Films and Television and Southern Star. Graeme-Evans, Kris Noble and Susan Bower served as the original executive producers.

The series was originally conceived as a then-intended television film pilot, which broadcast on Nine Network in 1996. Despite its success, and becoming the highest-rated telemovie in Australian television history, a series was not picked up by the network until several years later.

The majority of filming took place on location in Kingsford, a locality in South Australia. An instant success, McLeod's Daughters enjoyed critical acclaim, ultimately reaching the number one drama spot during its fourth and fifth season. The series was nominated for a number of awards, including 41 Logie Awards, winning eight in total, notably for Most Popular Actress, Most Popular Actor, Most Popular Australian Program, and Most Popular Australian Drama Series. It has also achieved acclaim around the world, having developed a devoted fan base in the United States, Canada, Ireland, several European countries, and is moderately successful in the United Kingdom.

Production

Development
Posie Graeme-Evans developed the idea for McLeod's Daughters in the early 1990s for her company Millenium Pictures in conjunction with the South Australian Film Corporation. She also developed the idea for children's television programs such as The Miraculous Mellops and Hi-5. The idea was for a television drama set on an Australian rural property with two half-sisters running the property inherited from their father with an all-female workforce. She developed the idea from stories from friends who grew up in the country and from the love of South Australian landscapes as shown in the paintings of Hans Heysen.

Graeme-Evans pitched the idea to the board of the Nine Network, who agreed to film a telemovie in March 1996 with Jack Thompson starring as the father Jack McLeod, whose death leads to the two half-sisters (portrayed by Kym Wilson as Tess and Tammy MacIntosh as Claire) inheriting the property. The character of Jack McLeod did not appear in the series, so Claire is now running Drovers Run, with the help of her father's farmhands, following her father's death from a heart attack. 

Following the success of the telemovie shown on Mother's Day 1996, the Nine Network board agreed to commission a 22-episode series, but the project was left on the shelf for four years. It was finally revived in late 2000 after the opening ceremony for the 2000 Sydney Olympics featured a The Man from Snowy River theme, which highlighted the cultural significance of the bush to Australians.

Casting
Lisa Chappell, a successful New Zealand actress, known for her role in the soap opera Gloss, was cast as Claire McLeod. The role of Claire was initially intended to go to actress Laurie Foell, for which was on hold for four months prior to the beginning of production, when Chappell, who was, at the time, in the process of setting up a theatre company, was invited to audition and received the part. Chappell was known to Australian audiences, appearing in seven episodes of Hercules: The Legendary Journeys. She is popular in New Zealand for her musical work, and has also appeared in the TV series The Stingers and The Cult. During the production of the series, she learned how to ride a horse and shear sheep.

Bridie Carter, a NIDA graduate, was virtually unknown to audiences, having only appeared in few guest roles in drama series which included Home and Away, Water Rats and All Saints. However, McLeod's Daughters marks her first major screen role. Both Carter and Chappell were chosen from a number of high-profile actors in what was described as an "exhaustive casting process".

Jessica Napier was cast in the supporting role of Becky Howard, a promiscuous young woman from a broken family, who is raped and finds refuge on Drover’s Run. Napier was recognised by executive producer Kris Noble while she was working on Wildside and considered her for a part on the series, for which Posie Graeme-Evans agreed. She admitted that the reason she accepted the part was because of Graeme-Evans. In an interview with the Sydney Morning Herald, she commented that "Being as passionate and in love with it as she [Graeme-Evans] has made it feel like a worthwhile project. I felt it was a project that was loved and one they would go all out to make work." Napier was a Sydney-based actor at the time and relocated to Adelaide for the part.

Locations 
McLeod's Daughters is filmed on location at Kingsford, a 135-acre (55 ha) property which is listed on the South Australian Heritage Register and is located in the locality of Kingsford, north of Gawler. which Posie Graeme-Evans refers to as "our very own backlot". Kingsford was originally part of a 30,000-acre (12,245ha) property. The historical house was built from Edinburgh sandstone, transported to Australia as a ship ballast. The house took over 30 years to build and was finished by 1856.

Kingsford had been used in the years prior to filming by the South Australian Government as a wheat research station then by a Montessori school as a primary school campus. The working property was purchased by The Nine Network in 1999. Although Kingsford was a grand property at the time, it is now quite run down - a look that was important for the production design of the series, as the McLeod family has no money for maintenance.

The interior scenes set at Drover’s Run are all filmed inside the house. It not only added authenticity to the production, but the large rooms and high ceilings were ideal for filming.

Locations in Gungellan 

 Drover’s Run – the main setting for the show. Drover’s Run has been in the McLeod family for years, passed down to father, son, and now daughters. Claire McLeod, Tess McLeod, and Jodi McLeod all have run Drovers Run along with part owners Stevie Ryan, Regan McLeod and Grace McLeod.
 Killarney – also known as the Ryan Empire. At the start of the series Harry Ryan owned the property, and as he grew older his sons Alex and Nick took over. After Nick and Tess married, they left to run a ranch in Argentina. Alex ran Killarney for a couple of years, until his biological father (Bryce) became part owner of the property. On Bryce's death, half-brother Marcus became part owner of the property. In the final years of the show both Alex and Marcus own and run Killarney, although Alex became a largely absentee owner as he also began to spend much of his time on the ranch in Argentina.
 Kinsellas – a local farm that was run by Sandra Kinsella from 2003–2006. The name was changed after Heath Barret bought it.
The Local Pub – (Gungellan Hotel) where everyone goes for a drink after a hard day's labour. Becky worked there in 2001, Jodi worked there briefly in 2005 and Tayler also worked there briefly in 2007. It is most likely the only pub in Gungellan.
 The Truck Stop – where most of the town buys their supplies and when they need fuel. It was first owned by Ken Logan, then his daughter Jennifer followed by Harry Ryan. When Harry was owner Terry Dodge managed it then Moira Doyle. Later on Moira and Regan McLeod went into business supplying the fuel, Phill Rakich was the last owner.
 The Town Hall – where most major events are held, such as the Miss Gungellan contest, plays, and the town's birthday celebration.
 Fisher – Gungellan's closest neighbouring town.

Filming 
The show was shot on Super 16 mm film, and is the first Australian drama series to be delivered in HDTV format. Three cameras were used, two on main unit and the third on second unit. Director of photography, Roger Dowling created the illusion that the series is shot on a 50,000 hectare property in the Australian bush, instead of on a heritage estate about the size of a hobby farm.

Cast and characters 

 Lisa Chappell as Claire McLeod (seasons 1–3)
 Bridie Carter as Tess Silverman McLeod (seasons 1–6)
 Jessica Napier as Becky Howard (seasons 1–3)
 Rachael Carpani as Jodi Fountain (seasons 1–7, guest season 8)
 Aaron Jeffery as Alex Ryan (seasons 1–7, guest season 8)
 Myles Pollard as Nick Ryan (seasons 1–5, guest season 6)
 Sonia Todd as Meg Fountain (seasons 1–4, recurring seasons 5–6, guest seasons 7–8)
 Simmone Jade Mackinnon as Stevie Hall (seasons 3–8)
 Brett Tucker as Dave Brewer (recurring season 3, main seasons 4–6)
 Michala Banas as Kate Manfredi (seasons 4–8)
 Jonny Pasvolsky as Matt Bosnich (seasons 5–6, recurring season 7)
 Luke Jacobz as Patrick Brewer (guest season 5, main season 6–8)
 Zoe Naylor as Regan McLeod (recurring seasons 5 and 8, main seasons 6–7)
 Dustin Clare as Riley Ward (recurring seasons 6, main season 7)
 Doris Younane as Moira Doyle (guest seasons 2–3, recurring seasons 4–6, main seasons 7–8)
 Gillian Alexy as Tayler Geddes (guest season 6, main season 7–8)
 Matt Passmore as Marcus Turner (seasons 7–8)
 Abi Tucker as Grace Kingston (seasons 7–8)
 Edwina Ritchard as Jaz McLeod (season 8)
 John Schwarz as Ben Hall (season 8)

Recurring cast
 John Jarratt as Terry Dodge (seasons 1–6)
 Marshall Napier as Harry Ryan (seasons 1–6)
 Fletcher Humphrys as Brett "Brick" Buchanan (seasons 1–3)
 Catherine Wilkin as Liz Ryan (seasons 1–4, 6)
 Luke Ford as Craig Woodland (seasons 1–4)
 Richard Wilson as Sean Howard (seasons 1–2)
 Rodger Corser as Peter Johnson (seasons 1–4)
 Ben Mortley as Alberto Borelli (seasons 1–3)
 Richard Healy as Kevin Fountain (seasons 2–3, 6)
 Inge Hornstra as Sandra Kinsella (seasons 2–6)
 Kathryn Hartman as Sally Clements (seasons 2–6)
 Charlie Clausen as Jake Harrison (seasons (2–3)
 John Stanton as Bryce Redstaff (seasons 3–4, 6–7)
 Basia A'Hern as Rose Hall-Smith (seasons 4–8)
 Craig McLachlan as Kane Morgan (season 4)
 Dean O'Gorman as Luke Morgan (seasons 4–5)
 Michelle Langstone as Fiona Webb (season 6)
 Dan Feuerriegel as Leo Coombes (season 6)
 Peter Hardy as Phil Rakich (seasons 6–8)
 Rachael Coopes as Ingrid Marr (seasons 7–8)

Guest appearances
Notable guest appearances include Chris Haywood, Max Cullen, Alexandra Davies, Murray Bartlett, Deborah Kennedy, Celia Ireland, Tim Campbell, Brooke Harman, Peter Cousens, Stephen Curry, Xavier Samuel, Gabby Millgate, Belinda Bromilow, Jeremy Lindsay Taylor, Tasma Walton, Glenda Linscott, Neil Melville, Josh Quong Tart, Rachael Taylor, Jeremy Sims, Sonja Tallis, Orpheus Pledger, Simone Buchanan, Rebecca Lavelle, Todd Lasance, Kain O'Keeffe, Adam Saunders, Liam Hemsworth, Jay Laga'aia, Luke Arnold, Spencer McLaren, Callan Mulvey, Craig Stott, Leah Purcell, Carole Skinner and Nicholas Bishop.

Main cast changes
The first three seasons follow the lives of half-sisters Claire McLeod and Tess Silverman McLeod, farmhands Jodi Fountain and Becky Howard, Jodi's mother and Drovers Run housekeeper Meg Fountain, and their affluent neighbors, the Ryan family.

The cast remained the same until the third season, when it was announced that Jessica Napier would be leaving. Her character, Becky Howard, initially decided to take a job at another farm with her boyfriend Jake, but then changed her mind and went back to school on the Agricultural Scholarship she had won during the young farmers competition. News of a second major cast change hit when it was announced that Lisa Chappell, who played Claire McLeod, would be leaving the series. Claire, Tess, and baby Charlotte were involved in a car accident, with Tess and Charlotte making it to safety before their vehicle slid over a cliff, killing Claire. Simmone Jade Mackinnon's character, Stevie Hall, was introduced to replace Chappell.

Season four began with the promotion of Brett Tucker to series regular. A new farm-hand, Kate Manfredi, was introduced in the fourteenth episode of season four. The introduction of Kate was to accommodate the departure of Meg, who left to pursue a writing job in Melbourne. She remained credited as a main character until the end of season 5.

When the show began to decrease in ratings in the fifth season, producers decided to introduce several new characters to try and liven up the show. They brought in the no-nonsense, secretive Rob Shelton who was employed as the overseer at Killarney; the geologist cousin of Tess and Jodi, Regan McLeod; and the troubled brother of Dave, Patrick Brewer. Even with these cast changes, the show suffered another major blow when Myles Pollard announced that he was leaving the show to pursue other opportunities in the USA. His character, Nick Ryan was supposedly killed in a plane crash.

Ratings started to rise in the sixth season, when it took on a more soap opera-type style, while staying true to the original premise of the show. This was the last season before the show began its downhill slope. After four seasons, recurring character Moria Doyle (played by Doris Younane) was promoted to series regular to replace Meg Fountain. Pollard returned briefly when it was revealed that Nick had not died in a plane crash, but had actually been unconscious in a hospital in Argentina. Bridie Carter also decided to leave the show, departing with Pollard when their characters returned to Argentina. This saw the return and promotion to the main cast of Regan McLeod. Another blow was dealt when Jonny Pasvolsky decided to quit. His character, Rob Shelton/Matt Bosnich, had to leave Gungellan when he was found by the hitmen who had been pursuing him. The return of Zoe Naylor's character, Regan McLeod was to accommodate the departure of Tess, however this had no impact. The ratings started to slip and two more characters were introduced: the replacement overseer for Killarney, Riley Ward, and the immature Tayler Geddes, whose father died in an explosion at a mine where Regan worked. The final episode saw Brett Tucker's character Dave Brewer depart the series to work as a vet in Africa and the temporary departure of Michala Banas's character, Kate Manfredi.

The seventh season saw the introduction of Marcus Turner, who was employed as an account manager by Bryce Redstaff, Alex's biological father. It was later revealed that Marcus was Alex's half-brother. The seventh season also saw the return of Matt Bosnich, who was free to continue his life outside of witness protection. The news, however, that Rachael Carpani was departing the show and her character Jodi McLeod, along with Matt, would be written out was soon announced and Matt and Jodi were "killed" in a car explosion. It later turned out that they were alive, but used a car explosion to cover up this fact so they could go into witness protection. To compensate for Carpani's departure, Abi Tucker's character Grace Kingston McLeod was introduced as the feisty sister of Regan and cousin of Jodi. Michala Banas's character Kate was written back in as was Sonia Todd's character Meg Fountain, however the latter departed soon after. It was announced that not only would Zoe Naylor be leaving, but so would the last remaining original cast member, Aaron Jeffery, though they would both return. Regan left to run a mine, while Alex left to help Nick and Tess in Argentina. A new vet, Ingrid Marr, was introduced to stir up trouble between Grace and Marcus. Dustin Clare's character Riley Ward was killed in a car accident at the end of season seven.

The departure of Michala Banas rocked the crew of McLeod's Daughters and her character was written out to work on a farm for at-risk youth. Aaron Jeffery returned for one episode in season eight, where his character Alex Ryan was killed when a large tree branch fell on him. Regan returned for the christening of baby Xander, who was born the day after Alex died. Stevie's fun-loving cousin Ben Hall was introduced as the new overseer of Killarney, replacing Riley, while the vivacious sister of Regan and Grace, Jaz McLeod returned to Drovers Run after making a guest appearance in season four. The series finale saw Sonia Todd and Rachael Carpani return as Meg Fountain and Jodi McLeod respectively.

Overview

The first season's storylines included:
 The reunion of Claire and Tess
 Meg’s and Terry's forbidden romance
 Becky's rape and subsequent pregnancy scare
 Tess's dream to own a cafe
 Liz's disapproval of Tess
 Brick's and Becky's relationship
 The mystery behind Nick's limp
 Jodi's and Alberto's blossoming romance

The second season's storylines included:
 Claire's and Peter's romance
 The arrival of Jodi's father
 Tess leaves to run her cafe
 Alberto's return from Italy
 Brick's disappearance
 Sandra's arrival
 Alex’s and Nick's infatuation with Tess
 Claire's pregnancy

The third season's storylines included:
 Alex and Claire's sexual tension
 Jodi and Alberto's marriage and subsequent annulment
 Becky's quest for Brick and new romance with Jake
 The sexual tension between Nick and Tess
 The birth of Claire's baby, Charlotte
 Sally and Nick's relationship
 Dave and Tess' relationship
 Sandra's meddling and romance with Alex
 The departure of Becky
 Tess' cancer scare
 The arrival of Stevie Hall
 Claire's car crash and her death
 Tess' quest: run Drover’s single-handedly

The fourth season's storylines included:
 Stevie's promotion to part-owner
 Nick and Tess' relationship and eventual marriage
 The custody battle for Charlotte
 Meg's decision to leave Drover’s
 The introduction of Kate Manfredi
 Sandra's pregnancy and subsequent miscarriage
 Jodi's relationship with Luke and her work with the CFS
 The brief arrival of cousin Jasmine
 The birth of Sally and Nick's son, Harrison

The fifth season's storylines included:
 The disintegration and eventual reconciliation of Tess and Nick's marriage
 Regan McLeod's arrival and plans to mine Drover’s
 Stevie and Alex's growing affection for one another
 The introduction of mysterious farm-hand Rob Shelton
 Meg's book publication
 Stevie's decision to tell Rose the truth
 The arrival of Dave's mentally-unstable little brother, Patrick
 Nick's presumed death
 Jodi's discovery that her father is Jack McLeod

The sixth season's storylines included:
 The discovery of Rob's witness protection secret
 Harry's murder and the subsequent police investigation
 The love triangle between Stevie, Alex and Fiona
 Nick's return and his departure with Tess
 Meg and Terry's engagement and wedding
 Regan's return and subsequent gain of Drover's
 Rose's work experience
 The arrival of the arrogant Riley Ward
 Dave and Kate's departure to Africa

The seventh season's storylines included:
 Rob/Matt's return and his and Jodi's relationship followed by their presumed death
 Moira and Phil's relationship
 Regan's departure
 Alex and Stevie's engagement and wedding
 The introduction of Grace McLeod and Marcus Turner
 Kate's return and her developing relationship with Riley
 Ashleigh's arrival and deception
 Rose's fall and subsequent paralysis
 Tayler and Patrick's growing friendship
 Stevie's pregnancy
 Riley's presumed death

The eighth and final season's storylines included:
 Kate's departure
 Alex's return, tragic death and the birth of his and Stevie's son
 The Grace-Marcus-Ingrid love triangle
 Jaz McLeod's return and Ben Hall's introduction
 The production of a controversial dam
 Ben and Jaz's relationship
 The return of Ingrid's violent husband
 Phil's musical about Moira's life
 Drover’s Run's financial crisis

Reception
The first episode of McLeod's Daughters eventually debuted in August 2001 and proved to be a hit, attracting 1.89 million viewers. The first season was a success, attracting an average of 1.5 million viewers per episode in Australia. The show aired in New Zealand on TV2, one of TVNZ's free-to-air channels. The final season on TV2 began airing a month after Australia and eventually became 10 episodes in front of Australia until the finale. Reruns from season one are currently on Vibe in New Zealand, a channel aimed at women's programming.

The second season of McLeod's Daughters was equally successful, being the third-most popular drama on Australian television. By 2003, the show was the most popular drama series on Australian television. Its popularity in Australia was highlighted when the show won four Logie Awards, including Lisa Chappell winning most popular female actor and Aaron Jeffery winning most popular actor, with the show itself winning most popular Australian drama series in 2004 and 2005.

The show then began to decline in popularity and perceived quality. Cast turnover was high, and increasingly far-fetched stories were used to explain the sudden departure of formerly important characters, such as Rachael Carpani, who departed in 2007 and Aaron Jeffery, who left in 2008. In 2007, many viewers considered the show to have "jumped the shark", as the show had drifted into a new direction, that of a soap opera; at that point, the show began to experience low ratings. Jeffery commented to The Daily Telegraph that his desire to depart from the show was due to the new direction the show was taking, which he did not like.

The 200th episode of McLeod's Daughters aired on 3 October 2007, with Hugh McLeod (Grace, Jasmine, and Regan's father) returning for this special event. An entirely different script was originally written when one of the original cast (speculated to be Bridie Carter) agreed to come back, but it was pulled at the last minute. Ratings for this episode were very poor by Australian standards, with only 1,008,000 viewers tuning in; the highest that season was 1,415,000 for episode 16.

The eighth and final season began on 23 July 2008 with the episode 203, "Aftermath", but after two further episodes, Channel 9 pulled the show from its schedule due to extremely low ratings. The remaining episodes were eventually aired from December to January in a double-episode format, with the final two episodes ("Into the Valley of the Shadow" and "The Long Paddock") airing on 31 January 2009 with original cast members returning for the special event.

Ratings

Awards and nominations

International broadcast
Following its instant success in Australia, Mcleod's Daughters was sold to over 100 countries, most notably, the US-based Hallmark Channel, which was available in several international countries, including Australia, Asia, and European countries, with time and broadcast dates varing. The series premiered in the UK on the Hallmark Channel in Autumn 2001, originally in a weekend primetime slot. Due to its growing success, Hallmark secured the rights to the third season in 2002 and the fourth season in 2003, which were then scheduled for 26 and 30 episodes, respectively, before being extended. The third season eventually screened from 28 August 2003 on the network, while season four commenced in 2004. During the later years of the series, it was moved from its primetime slot to an 11 am morning slot. The final season began airing in the UK Hallmark on 12 October 2008 with double episodes every Sunday morning from 11:00 am to 1:00 pm. The final two episode aired in the UK on Sunday 21 December 2008, a month before the episodes aired in Australia.

In Germany the final two episodes aired on 4 November 2008 in a German-dubbed-version, a month before airing in the UK in the original language. In Ireland, RTÉ Two began airing the final season in mid-2010 in a late-night time slot, with the final episode airing early 2011. This was the first time season 8 had been shown on the channel, as RTÉ had long period gaps between each season. In early 2011, the channel began airing the series from the beginning, but was stopped less than halfway through the first season. In the US, the series debuted on 2 October 2004 on the WE tv (Women's Entertainment) cable channel, and ran for several seasons.

Home media

VHS

DVD

Soundtrack

Three albums, selected from the music from the series, were released in 2002, 2004, and 2008.

Streaming
In Australia, the complete series is available to stream on 9Now, and Stan. In New Zealand, it is available via TVNZ+. Netflix made all 8 seasons available to US subscribers in 2009. The series was available to stream in the UK via Amazon Prime Video's main subscription service before moving to Amazon Freevee, a free ad-based service from Amazon. It can also be streamed on the UK's STV Player. It is available in multiple countries on Pluto TV, where it features a McLeod's Daughters channel and the entire series on demand.

Potential reboot
On 6 July 2017, the Nine Network confirmed that they were in talks with Posie Graeme-Evans about a potential reboot of the series. On 6 September 2017, Posie Graeme-Evans announced, "We have a story now, and I think it's a cracker. Just finishing the work we need to do before I talk about the next steps with the network." On 23 October 2017, Posie Graeme-Evans announced she had ended negotiations with Nine as creative differences for a new series remained, but has not ruled out potentially crowd-funding her project.

See also 
 List of Australian television series
 The Saddle Club

Notes

References

External links 
 McLeod's Daughters at the Australian Television Information Archive
 Interview with the cast on WHO.com
 McLeod's Daughters at the National Film and Sound Archive
 
 McLeod's Daughters Season 1-8 Full Episodes Now Available on YouTube

 
2001 Australian television series debuts
2009 Australian television series endings
APRA Award winners
Australian drama television series
English-language television shows
Nine Network original programming
Television shows set in Adelaide
Television series by Endemol Australia
Family saga television series
Australian television soap operas